Dmitry Golitsyn (1771–1844) was a Russian cavalry general.

Dmitry Golitsyn, under variant transliterations, may also refer to:

 Dmitry Mikhaylovich Golitsyn (1665–1737), Russian aristocrat and constitutionalist
 Dmitry Mikhailovich Golitsyn (1721–1793), Russian diplomat in Vienna
 Dmitri Alekseyevich Gallitzin (1738–1803), Russian ambassador to the Netherlands
 Demetrius Augustine Gallitzin (1770–1840), the first Roman Catholic priest ordained in America
 Dmitri Petrovich Golitsyn (1860–1928) – writer and politician, leader of the Russian Assembly